The men's triple jump event at the 1967 European Indoor Games was held on 11 and 12 March in Prague.

Medalists

Results

Qualification

Final

References

Triple jump at the European Athletics Indoor Championships
Triple